Prisočka  (Присочка) is populated place in Bosnia and Herzegovina, Republika Srpska, Kotor Varoš Municipality.

The administrative area of Prisočka  includes the villages: Vrevići, Sipići, Zuhrići (image), Ćorkovići, Vrbovo, Pajići, Lozići, Fodlovići, Crepovi, Durakovići, Tuleža,  Kovačevići, and Palivuk.
A village in Prisočka: Zuhrići (at the hill)

Population

See also
Šiprage

References

External links 
 (-{Fallingrain}-)
 Prisocka Map — Satellite Images of Prisocka (Maplandia)

Villages in Bosnia and Herzegovina
Populated places in Kotor Varoš